Digitivalva orientella is a moth of the family Acrolepiidae. It is found in Slovenia, Croatia, Romania, the Republic of Macedonia, Ukraine and Russia. It has also been recorded from Turkey.

The larvae feed on Inula species. They mine the leaves of their host plant.

References

Acrolepiidae
Moths described in 1956
Insects of Turkey